WXND may refer to:

 WXND-LP (Kentucky), a radio station (100.9 FM) licensed to serve Louisville, Kentucky, United States
 WXND-LP (New Hampshire), a defunct radio station (107.3 FM) formerly licensed to serve Etna, New Hampshire, United States